Charles Metcalfe may refer to:

Charles Metcalfe, 1st Baron Metcalfe (1785–1846), British colonial administrator
Charles Metcalfe (British Army officer) (1865–1912), British general
Charles Russell Metcalfe (1904–1991), English botanist

See also
Charles D. Metcalf (born 1933), United States Air Force general
Metcalfe (surname)